Every Move She Makes is a 1984 Australian TV movie about a woman who has an obsessed lover.

Cast
 Julie Nihill as Alison Berger
 Doug Bowles as Matthew Pitt
 Pepe Trevor as Jackie
 James Laurie as Andrew
 Bruce Myles as Defence
 Victor Kazan as Prosecurtor
 Bruce Knappett as Berger
 Ross Williams as Alison's Supervisor
 Rob Williams as Sgt. McCechnie
 Shane Conner as Nick
 Mike Bishop as Bob
 Alton Harvey as Mr. Pitt
 Eileen Chapman as Mrs. Pitt
 Vanessa Windsor as Cecilia

References

External links
Every Move She Makes at ABC

Australian drama television films
1984 television films
1984 films
1984 drama films
1980s English-language films